Avatar 3 is an upcoming American epic science fiction film directed, written, co-produced, and co-edited by James Cameron. It is the third film in Cameron's Avatar franchise, and a sequel to Avatar: The Way of Water (2022). Cameron is producing the film with Jon Landau.  Cameron, Rick Jaffa, Amanda Silver, Josh Friedman and Shane Salerno were involved in the writing process. Cast members Sam Worthington, Zoe Saldaña, Sigourney Weaver, Stephen Lang, Kate Winslet, Cliff Curtis, Joel David Moore, CCH Pounder, Edie Falco, Brendan Cowell, Jemaine Clement, Britain Dalton, Trinity Jo-Li Bliss, Jack Champion, Bailey Bass, Filip Geljo, Dileep Rao, Matt Gerald, and Giovanni Ribisi reprise their roles from previous films, with Michelle Yeoh, David Thewlis, and Oona Chaplin portraying new characters. Cameron stated that Avatar: The Seed Bearer is being considered as a possible title for the film.

Cameron, who had stated in 2006 that he would like to make sequels to Avatar if it was successful, announced the first two sequels in 2010 following the widespread success of the first film, with Avatar 3 aiming for a 2015 release. However, the addition of two more sequels (four in total), and the necessity to develop new technology in order to film performance capture scenes underwater, a feat never accomplished before, led to significant delays to allow the crew more time to work on the writing, pre-production, and visual effects. Avatar 3 started shooting simultaneously with Avatar: The Way of Water in New Zealand on September 25, 2017; filming completed in late-December 2020, after over three years of shooting.

The film's theatrical release has been subject to eight delays, with the latest occurring on July 23, 2020; it is scheduled for release on December 20, 2024. Two additional sequels, Avatar 4 and Avatar 5, are in various stages of production and are expected to be released on December 18, 2026, and December 22, 2028, respectively.

Cast

 Sam Worthington as Jake Sully, a former human who fell in love with Neytiri and befriended the Na'vi after becoming a part of the Avatar Program, eventually taking their side in their conflict with humans and transferred his mind into his avatar permanently. After the second film, he and his family have left the Omatikaya clan and joined the Metkayina clan.
 Zoe Saldaña as Neytiri, Jake's wife who left the Omatikaya, and joined the Metkayina.
 Sigourney Weaver as Kiri, the daughter of Dr. Grace Augustine's Na’vi avatar who was adopted by Jake and Neytiri. 
 Stephen Lang as Colonel Miles Quaritch, a human who led the forces of the RDA, the human organization colonizing Pandora, and died in their conflict with the Na'vi in 2154. Years later, the RDA placed his and other deceased soldiers' memories into Na'vi Avatars called recombinants. 
 Kate Winslet as Ronal, a free diver of the Metkayina and Tonowari's wife, who is pregnant.
 Cliff Curtis as Tonowari, the leader of the reef people clan of Metkayina.
 Joel David Moore as Dr. Norm Spellman, a former part of the Avatar Program who chose to side with the Na'vi in the first film.
 CCH Pounder as Mo'at, the Omaticaya's spiritual leader and Neytiri's mother.
 Edie Falco as General Frances Ardmore, the commander in charge of the RDA's interests.
 Brendan Cowell as Captain Mick Scoresby, the head of a private sector marine hunting vessel on the planet of Pandora.
 Jemaine Clement as Dr. Ian Garvin, a marine biologist.
 Britain Dalton as Lo'ak, Jake and Neytiri's second son and the narrator of the film.
 Trinity Jo-Li Bliss as Tuktirey ("Tuk"), Jake and Neytiri's eight-year-old daughter and their youngest child.
 Jack Champion as Miles "Spider" Socorro, the teenaged son of Quaritch born in Hell's Gate (the human base on Pandora in the first film) who was rescued and adopted by Jake and Neytiri after they had previously killed his father.
 Bailey Bass as Tsireya ("Reya"), a graceful and strong free diver of the Metkayina and Tonowari and Ronal's daughter. In the second film, Tsireya emerges as Lo'ak's love interest.
 Filip Geljo as Ao'nung, a young male hunter and free diver of the Metkayina and Tonowari and Ronal's son.
 Giovanni Ribisi as Parker Selfridge, the former corporate administrator for the RDA mining operation in the first film.
 Dileep Rao as Dr. Max Patel, a scientist who worked in the Avatar Program and came to support Jake's rebellion against the RDA.
 Matt Gerald as Corporal Lyle Wainfleet, a mercenary who fought and died in the RDA's battle against the Na'vi in 2154. Years later, the RDA placed his memories into a recombinant.

David Thewlis has been cast as an unnamed Na'vi character who  will be featured in Avatar 3 to 5. Oona Chaplin and Michelle Yeoh portray Varang, the Na'vi leader of a volcano-dwelling "Ash People" clan, and Dr. Karina Mogue, a human scientist, respectively. The film will also see the return of Payakan, the Tulkun who befriends Lo'ak.

Production

Development 
In 2006, James Cameron stated that if Avatar was successful, he hoped to make two sequels to the film. In 2010, he said the film's widespread success confirmed that he would do so. He included certain scenes in the first film for future story follow-ups. Cameron planned to shoot the sequels back-to-back and to begin work "once the novel is nailed down". The sequels were confirmed as continuing to follow the characters of Jake and Neytiri in December 2009. Cameron implied that the humans would return as the antagonists of the story. In 2011, Cameron stated his intention to film the sequels at a higher frame rate than the industry standard 24 frames per second, in order to add a heightened sense of reality.

In 2013, Cameron announced that the sequels would be filmed in New Zealand, with performance capture to take place in 2014. An agreement with the New Zealand government required at least one world premiere to be held in Wellington and at least NZ$500 million (approximately US$410 million at December 2013 exchange rates) to be spent on production activity in New Zealand, including live-action filming and visual effects. The New Zealand government announced it would raise its baseline tax rebate for filmmaking from 15% to 20%, with 25% available to international productions in some cases and 40% for New Zealand productions (as defined by section 18 of the New Zealand Film Commission Act 1978).

In February 2016, production of the sequels was scheduled to begin in April 2016 in New Zealand. Cinematographer Russell Carpenter, who worked with Cameron on True Lies and Titanic, and art director Aashrita Kamath, joined as crew members for the four sequels. Kirk Krack, founder of Performance Freediving International, worked as a free-diving trainer for the cast and crew for the underwater scenes. On July 31, 2017, it was announced that the New Zealand-based visual effects studio Weta Digital had commenced work on the Avatar sequels.

Rick Jaffa and Amanda Silver were originally announced as Cameron's co-writers; it was later announced that Cameron, Jaffa, Silver, Josh Friedman, and Shane Salerno took a part in the writing process of all of the sequels before being assigned to finish the separate scripts, making the eventual writing credits unclear. However, Josh Friedman announced in November 2015, via his Twitter, that he co-wrote the third film.  In November 2022, Friedman announced that he actually had co-written the screenplay for the fourth film.

Writing 
Cameron wanted to explore "different cultures" from the first two Avatar films by including "Ash People"—fiery versions of Na'vi. He chose them to add "another angle" as enemies because Cameron previously took Na'vi "good sides" and humans on another.  Landau said that "There are good humans, and there are bad humans — the same thing on the Na'avi side — but oftentimes, people don't see themselves as bad. What is the root cause of how they evolve into what we perceive as bad? Maybe there are other factors there that we're not aware of."

Champion said of reading the script for Avatar 3:

Casting 
Sam Worthington and Zoe Saldaña were confirmed in January 2010 to have signed on to reprise their roles in the sequels. Cameron also stated that Sigourney Weaver would be featured in all three sequels (the fourth one was not planned at the time) and that her character Grace Augustine would be alive, but it was later revealed she would instead be playing Kiri, Jake and Neytiri's adopted daughter.  In August 2017, in an interview with Empire, Cameron revealed that Stephen Lang would not only be returning in all four sequels but he would also be the main villain in all four films.

In August 2017, Matt Gerald had officially signed on to portray his first film's role Corporal Lyle Wainfleet in all upcoming sequels. On October 3, 2017, Kate Winslet had signed on in all four sequels for an unspecified role in the film. Cameron commented, "Kate and I had been looking for something to do together for 20 years, since our collaboration on Titanic, which was one of the most rewarding of my career", and added that her character was named Ronal. On January 25, 2018, Dileep Rao was confirmed to return as Dr. Max Patel. Winslet commented that her role was "relatively small comparative to the lengthy shoot", as she would only have one month of shootings, but also "a pivotal character in the ongoing story".

In June 2017, Oona Chaplin joined the cast as Varang, "a strong and vibrant central character who spans the entire saga of the sequels" starting with 3. Eiza González also auditioned for Chaplin's role. In April 2018, David Thewlis revealed his involvement in the franchise, stating that he would be featured in three of the four sequels, later stating in January 2020 that his character was a Na'vi. This led to Thewlis being largely reported as part of the cast of Avatar: The Way of Water; however, he stated in June 2020 that the reports were wrong, and that he would actually be a part of Avatar 3 to 5. In 2019, Michelle Yeoh joined the cast in a live-action role as Dr Karina Mogue.

Filming 
Principal photography on Avatar: The Way of Water and 3 began simultaneously on September 25, 2017, in Manhattan Beach, California. On November 14, 2018, Cameron announced filming with the principal performance capture cast had been completed. Most filming on the next two sequels will begin after wrapping the post-production on first two sequels. According to producer Jon Landau, live-action filming for Avatar 3 and its predecessor commenced in New Zealand in early 2019. On March 17, 2020, Landau announced that the filming of the Avatar sequel films in New Zealand had been postponed indefinitely in response to the COVID-19 pandemic. He also confirmed that production would remain in Los Angeles. However, work on visual effects will continue at Weta Digital in Wellington.

In early May, health and safety production protocols have been endorsed by the New Zealand government, allowing filming to resume in the country. However the production team for the Avatar sequels has not yet returned to New Zealand. On May 31, part of the Avatar crew including James Cameron were granted entry into New Zealand under a special visa category for border exemptions for foreigners deemed essential to a project of "significant economic value." On June 1, 2020, Landau posted a picture of himself and Cameron on Instagram, showing that they had returned to New Zealand to resume filming. After their arrival, all 55 crew members who had traveled to New Zealand started a 2-week government-supervised isolation period at a hotel in Wellington before they would resume filming. This would make Avatar: The Way of Water and 3 the first major Hollywood blockbusters to resume production after postponing filming due to the pandemic. In September 2020, Cameron announced that 95% of Avatar 3 had been completed. Filming wrapped in December 2020.

In early July 2022, the New Zealand Film Commission acknowledged that the Avatar sequels had received over NZ$140 million worth of taxpayer funding via the country's Screen Production Grant.  By comparison, The Hobbit trilogy had received NZ$161 million in film subsidies. While ACT party deputy leader Brooke van Velden criticised the Government's film subsidy programme for allegedly diverting public funding from other areas, the Economic Development and Regional Development Minister Stuart Nash argued that New Zealand's film subsidies for major Hollywood products brought substantial overseas investment and jobs for the New Zealand film industry.

Music 
In August 2021, Landau announced that Simon Franglen would compose the score for the Avatar sequels.

Release 
Avatar 3 is scheduled to be released on December 20, 2024, by 20th Century Studios. Like its predecessor, the film was subjected to eight delays, since the crew took more time on the writing, pre-production and visual effects process. It was originally scheduled for December 2015, until Cameron pushed the release to 2016, 2017 and 2018. In April 2016, coinciding with the launch of four Avatar sequels, a new release date of December 2020 was announced. The following year, a new release date of December 17, 2021 was announced, with the recurring sequels: Avatar 4 and 5 releasing on December 20, 2024, and December 19, 2025, respectively. However, following the announcement of the three upcoming Star Wars films, in May 2019, the sequels' release dates were pushed back to two years, with Avatar 3, being scheduled to be released on December 22, 2023. The release date was again deferred due to the COVID-19 pandemic, and in August 2020, a new release of December 20, 2024 was announced. Avatar 3 and its forthcoming sequels will be released in Dolby Vision.

In December 2022, shortly after Avatar: The Way of Water was released, it was revealed that James Cameron's first cut of Avatar 3 had a running time of nine hours. James Cameron revealed in an interview with 20 minutes that the film would feature new Na'vi people, called the 'Ash people', who will be the antagonists of the film.

Sequels 

Avatar 3 is the second of four planned sequels to Avatar. Avatar 4 and Avatar 5 are planned to follow after the third film's release. Although the last two sequels have been reportedly greenlit, Cameron stated in a November 26, 2017 interview: "Let's face it, if Avatar 2 and 3 don't make enough money, there's not going to be a 4 and 5". David Thewlis later confirmed this in February 2018, stating "they're making 2 and 3, they're gonna see if people go and see them, and then they'll make 4 and 5". Conversely, Sigourney Weaver stated in November 2018, after the first two sequels had completed main photography, that she was currently "busy doing Avatar 4 and 5", which several media outlets interpreted as confirmation that the last two sequels had started filming. In January 2019, in face of the proposed acquisition of 21st Century Fox by The Walt Disney Company, Disney CEO Bob Iger confirmed that both Avatar 4 and Avatar 5 are being developed but have not been officially greenlit. According to producer Jon Landau in February 2019, Iger may have been misinterpreted. He said that Avatar 4 and 5 "are not only [greenlit]" but also a third of Avatar 4 has already been filmed. In September 2022, at the D23 Expo, Cameron announced that principal photography had officially begun for Avatar 4.

References

External links 

 

Upcoming films
2024 films
2020s 3D films
2024 science fiction films
American epic films
American sequel films
American action adventure films
American science fiction action films
American science fiction adventure films
American space adventure films
Fictional-language films
Films about extraterrestrial life
Films directed by James Cameron
Films with screenplays by James Cameron
Films with screenplays by Rick Jaffa and Amanda Silver
Films produced by James Cameron
Films produced by Jon Landau
Films scored by Simon Franglen
Films set in the 22nd century
Films set on fictional moons
Films shot in Hawaii
Films shot in Los Angeles County, California
Films shot in New Zealand
Films using motion capture
IMAX films
Lightstorm Entertainment films
Upcoming sequel films
Avatar (franchise) films
20th Century Studios films
Film productions suspended due to the COVID-19 pandemic
Films postponed due to the COVID-19 pandemic
2020s English-language films
2020s American films